Lipińskie may refer to the following places:
Lipińskie, Masovian Voivodeship (east-central Poland)
Lipińskie, Podlaskie Voivodeship (north-east Poland)
Lipińskie, Giżycko County in Warmian-Masurian Voivodeship (north Poland)
Lipińskie, Pisz County in Warmian-Masurian Voivodeship (north Poland)